The Order of Ikhamanga is a South African honour. It was instituted on 30 November 2003 and is granted by the President of South Africa for achievements in arts, culture, literature, music, journalism, and sports (which were initially recognised by the Order of the Baobab).  The order has three classes:
 Gold (OIG), for exceptional achievement,
 Silver (OIS), for excellent achievement,
 Bronze (OIB), for outstanding achievement.

Ikhamanga is the Xhosa name for Strelitzia reginae, a flower.

Design
The egg-shaped badge depicts a rising sun, a "Lydenburg head", two strelitzia flowers, a drum, three circles, and two roadways.  The head represents the arts, the sun represents glory, the circles symbolise sport, and the roads represent the long road to excellence. The South African coat of arms is displayed on the reverse.

The ribbon is gold with four cream-coloured lines inset from each edge and a pattern of recurring stylised dancing figures down the centre.  All three classes are worn around the neck.

The National Order of Ikhamanga was designed by Charles Peter Gareth Smart, a graphic designer based in Pretoria, South Africa.

Recipients

Gold
Julian Bahula for music
Natalie du Toit for swimming
2010 FIFA World Cup Bid Committee for football
Jonas Gwangwa for music
Bessie Head (posthumous) for writing
Danny Jordaan for football administration
Ramapolo Hugh Masekela for music
Joseph Albert Mashite Mokoena (posthumous) for mathematics 
Steve Mokone for football
Molefi Nathanael Oliphant for football administration
Alan Paton (posthumous) for literature
George Pemba (posthumous) for painting
Gary Player for golf
Mamokgethi Phakeng for Mathematics
Lewis Pugh for swimming
Tiyo Soga (posthumous) for exceptional contribution to literature and the struggle for social change
Benedict Wallet Vilakazi for indigenous literature
Johaar Mosaval for ballet

Silver
Hashim Amla for cricket
Eric Baloyi for coaching boxing
Sathima Bea Benjamin for singing
Willie Bester for art
André P. Brink for writing
Thomas Chauke for music
Kitch Christie for rugby
Johnny Clegg for music
Hestrie Cloete for athletics
Johannes Jacobus Degenaar for philosophy
Darius Dhlomo for football and boxing
Basil D'Oliveira for cricket
Morné du Plessis for rugby
Athol Fugard for theatre
Sylvia Glasser for dancing
Vera Gow for singing
Ilse Hayes for athletics
Hassan Howa for sports administration
Ingrid Jonker (posthumous) for poetry
Elsa Joubert for writing
Bryan Habana for rugby
Penny Heyns for swimming
John Kani for theatre
Grant Khomo for rugby
Irvin Khoza for football administration
Alfred Khumalo for photography
Abigail Kubeka for music
Mandla Langa for writing
Chad le Clos for swimming
Stephanus Lombaard for athletics
Makana Football Association for football
Eric Majola for cricket
Elijah Makhathini for boxing
Sydney Maree for athletics
James Matthews for poetry
Elana Meyer for athletics
Gladys Mgudlandlu (posthumous) for art
Percy Montgomery for rugby
Kaizer Motaung for football
Theo Mthembu for boxing
Muthal Naidoo for literature and drama
Ryk Neethling for swimming
Lionel Ngakane for film making
Lauretta Ngcobo for writing
Nomhle Nkonyeni for performing arts
Lewis Nkosi for literature
Makhaya Ntini for cricket
Patrick Ntsoelengoe for football
Jacob Ntuli for boxing
Henry Nxumalo (posthumous) for journalism
Marguerite Poland for indigenous languages, literature and anthropology
Ray Phiri for music
Shaun Pollock for cricket
Sandra Prinsloo for acting
Lucas Radebe for football
Sam Ramsamy for sports administration
Dolly Rathebe (posthumous) for music
Eddie Roux for political literature
Sewsunker Sewgolum (posthumous) for golf
Roland Schoeman for swimming
Mmakgabo Mmapula Helen Sebidi for art
Jomo Sono for football
Stanley Sono for football and boxing
John Smit for rugby
George Singh for football administration
Lucas Sithole for tennis
Zanele Situ for athletics
Can Themba (posthumous) for writing
Josiah Thugwane for athletics
Miriam Tlali for writing
Neil Tovey for football
Jake Tuli (posthumous) for boxing
Cameron van der Burgh for swimming
Fanie van der Merwe for athletics
Ernst van Dyk for wheelchair racing
Cheeky Watson for rugby
Pretty Yende for singing
Busi Victoria Mhlongo for singing
Achmat Davids (posthumous) for literature
Jacques Henry Kallis for cricket
Yvonne “Chaka Chaka” Mhinga for music
Nomhle Nkonyeni for performing arts
Benjamin Pogrund for journalism
Mathatha Tsedu for journalism
Mary Twala Mhlongo for performing arts
Lionel Morrison for journalism
Keorapetse Kgositsile for poetry

Bronze
Christian Ashley-Botha for choral music
Gerrie Coetzee for boxing
Sindiwe Magona for literature
Elsa Meyer for senior athletics
Teboho Mokgalagadi for athletics
Khotso Mokoena for athletics
Themba Patrick Magaisa for literature
Mbulaeni Mulaudzi (posthumous) for athletics
Oscar Pistorius for athletics (stripped)
Caster Semenya for athletics
Victor Ralushai for indigenous history
Jeanne Zaidel-Rudolph for composing music
Sibusiso Vilane for mountaineering
Marjorie Wallace for art
Laurika Rauch for her outstanding contribution to the field of music and raising awareness on political injustices through music.
Matlhaela Michael Masote for his outstanding contribution to the development of youth orchestras and choral music in the classical genre in South Africa.

See also
 South African civil honours

References

 South African Government Gazette No 25799 (2 December 2003)
 South African Government website
  (2002–2019)

External links
 South African government website
 Lucas Sithole (tennis)
 
 South African government website Order of Ikhamanga search
 Article Regarding Reverend Frank Chikane and the Presentation introduction of the Order

 
Society of South Africa
Awards established in 2003
2003 establishments in South Africa